Wetworks is an American comic book series created by comic book artist Whilce Portacio and writer Brandon Choi. It ran for four years before ending in 1998. A second series written by Mike Carey, with Portacio returning on art duties, was started in 2006 and ended in 2008.

The story is about a team of black operative soldiers bonded with golden symbiotes, who battle against supernatural forces.

Publication history
Originally intended as one of the core Image Comics launch titles in 1992, the series was put on hiatus until 1994 due to the death of Portacio's sister. After re-solicitation by Image (through Jim Lee's Wildstorm imprint), the original series ran for 43 issues, from 1994–1998. The first 3 issues were collected as a trade paperback in 1996 from Image Comics/Wildstorm.

A relaunch of the same title began in 2006 by writer Mike Carey and creator Whilce Portacio. It follows the original team leader, Dane, as he and Mother One form a new Wetworks team to continue combating supernatural forces. As of issue #10 the creative team changed to writer J. M. DeMatteis and artists Joel Gomez and Trevor Scott, with Portacio remaining on as cover artist. The new series was cancelled with issue #15.

Wetworks reappeared as one of the one-shots in Wildstorm: Armageddon, but it was not one of the series restarted following the World's End events.

Plot
Wetworks is a covert operations team in the Wildstorm Universe, designated Team 7, led by Colonel Jackson Dane, who was a member of the original Team 7.  In issue #1 of the series, Team 7 was sent on a (suicide) mission by International Operations' (I/O) Director Miles Craven. The mission was to enter a terrorist enclave on the Raanes Peninsula (Eastern Europe) and extract a biological agent the terrorists had in their possession.  Once the team reached the target, they found out that someone had raided the enclave before them. While investigating, the team found several big transparent tubes containing some kind of golden fluid. At that moment, the explosives they were carrying were activated by remote control, displaying a ten-minute countdown. That was when the team knew they were double crossed.

A hidden sniper shot at one of the tubes when team member Clayton "Claymore" Maure was examining it. The tube broke and the golden fluid jumped on Claymore as if it were alive, covering his whole body. If that was not enough, they were attacked by some terrorists. The terrorists started shooting, but the bullets bounced off Claymore's gold-covered body. Time was ticking and Col. Dane decided the team should open the remaining tubes to use the golden symbiotes as protection against the detonation of the explosives

 
After the detonation, the enclave was destroyed, but Team 7 emerged from the fire unharmed.  That was when I/O's cleaners (three aircraft) were ordered to enter the site to kill the surviving team members. The field leader of the cleaners, Mother One, double crossed I/O and shot down two aircraft before destroying her own. Mother One also had a golden symbiote, although it was not shown how she acquired it.

Mother One explained to Team 7 they were double crossed by Craven and I/O and asked them to accompany her to her boss, industrialist Armand Waering.

Col. Dane reluctantly accepted and they started to work for Armand Waering. Waering told them that he wanted to kill the Vampire Nation because they wanted to take over the world from the humans. What he did not tell the team was that he was actually the Jaquar, leader of the Werenation.

Two members of Wetworks died early in their battles with the undead – Flattop and Crossbones. Later Pilgrim's brother, Nathaniel Blackbird joined the squad, and they learned that both he and Pilgrim (unknown to her) were both werewolves. Several members of the squad died during a major mission some time later, including Dozer and Claymore, and Wetworks broke up. Recently Dane has reactivated the team to deal with breaks in reality caused by another superteam, which have been turned into portals for forces from another dimension.

World's End 
After the massive destruction dealt to Earth in the Number of the Beast miniseries, Lynch, head of the former Team 7, tries to convince Dane and the Wetworks into rejoining the Team, in an attempt to reverse the devastation and restore Earth to its former state.

Dane refuses his proposal since he no longer believes in a simple solution, and prefers tasking the Wetworks of defending humanity from the vampires. This is further detailed in Stormwatch - PHD as that team is targeted by Eastern European vampires.

Characters

Original series members

Claymore (Clayton H. Maure)
Nexus of all symbiotes, enables him to access and combine all the teams powers. 
Crossbones (Nicholas A. Jones) [KIA Wetworks #3]
Dane (Jackson Michael Dane) Member of the original Team 7
Reactivated his Gen-Factor. Enhanced Gen-Factor prevents/protects Dane from bonding with the symbiote.
Dozer (Joseph H. Mendoza)
Enhanced strength and size augmentation. Energy orbs provide sensory information about its surroundings.
Flattop (Jason C. Phillips) [KIA Wetworks #3]
Grail (Salvador Joel Alonday)
Energy Being, Energy shields and projection. Can extend his form to create energy melee weapons.
Jester (Cord Dexter Lemoyne)
Permanent Liquid Metal Form, Shapeshifting, Limited Shiftmorphing, Requires no nourishment or rest.
Mother-One (Rachel L. Rhodes)
Cyborg Technopath. Vampirism. Effective laser protection system.
Pilgrim (Maritza Blackbird)
Invisibility, limited time & dimensional travel, teleportation. Suppressed werewolf
Blackbird (Nathaniel Blackbird)
Werewolf. Enhanced senses, strength, reflexes and agility

Second series members
Dane (Jackson Michael Dane)
Mother-One (Rachel L. Rhodes)
Red (Persephone)
Dustwalker (Ab-Death)
Sebastian Ashe

Collected editions
One collection of the first series has been released:

Wetworks: Rebirth (collects #1–3, 96 pages, Image Comics/Wildstorm, October 1996)

The new series has been collected in two trade paperbacks:

Wetworks Book 1 (collects #1–5 plus two short stories, 136 pages, Wildstorm, October 2007)
Wetworks Book 2 (collects #6–9 and 13–15, 160 pages, Wildstorm, January 2008)

In other media

Television
The Pilgrim appears in DC's Legends of Tomorrow season 1 episodes "The Magnificent Eight" and "Last Refuge" portrayed by Faye Kingslee. This version is an assassin of  Time Masters. She traveled back to Central City in 1990 to take out a younger Mick Rory. However, she was stopped by Ray Palmer and then changed her focus to a younger version of Sara Lance. After travelling to 2007 she attacked the police station and took out multiple officers as well as Quentin Lance as they tried to stop her. She cornered Sara, but was stopped by the present day versions of Mick Rory and Sara. She fought Sara in hand to hand combat with Sara managing to disarm her. The Pilgrim was able to deprive Sara of her staffs. She started to overpower Sara but was thrown to the floor. The Pilgrim was able to retrieve her gun, however before she was able to shoot Sara she was hit with a blast from Mick Rory's Heat Gun. After failing on both occasions, she tried to kill Palmer in 2014 but was stopped by Jefferson Jackson and Rip, who used technology from Palmer to blow her out of the window. She then went back to 1993 to kill Jefferson as a baby, but he was spirited away by the team before she could get to him. Switching tactics the Pilgrim proceeded by kidnapping family members of the team, using them to blackmail Rip into surrendering themselves. Rip offered her his younger self and that way she could stop the entire team from being formed by killing him. She agreed, but before she could take the young boy, the team attacked her during the trade. She was surrounded and they fired their weapons. She began to reflect their attacks backwards, but was stabbed by the younger Rip Hunter, which distracted her and led the team to disintegrating her into ash.

Toys
Two waves of Wetworks action figures were produced by McFarlane Toys from 1995 to 1996.

References

External links
 Independent Hero Page
 Review of issue #1 of the new series

1994 comics debuts
1998 comics endings
2006 comics debuts
2008 comics endings
WildStorm superhero teams
Characters created by Whilce Portacio